{| class="infobox" style="width: 25em; text-align: left; font-size: 90%; vertical-align: middle;"
|+ <span style="font-size: 9pt">'List of accolades received by The Sixth Sense</span>
|-
| colspan="3" style="text-align:center;" |
Haley Joel Osment, nominated for over a dozen awards for his performance as Cole Sear
|- style="background:#d9e8ff;"
| style="text-align:center;" colspan="3"|Total number of wins and nominations'|-
|
|
|
|- style="background:#d9e8ff;"
| colspan="3" style="font-size: smaller; text-align:center;" | References
|}The Sixth Sense is an American supernatural thriller film, written and directed by M. Night Shyamalan. The film was released on August 6, 1999, grossing over $26,600,000 on its opening weekend and ranking first place at the box office. Overall the film grossed over $293,500,000 domestically and $672,800,000 worldwide, which is approximately 16.8 times its budget of $40 million. The Sixth Sense was well received by critics, with an approval rating of 85% from review aggregator Rotten Tomatoes.

The film has received numerous awards and nominations, with nomination categories ranging from those honoring the film itself (Best Film), to its writing, editing, and direction (Best Direction, Best Editing, Best Original Screenplay), to its cast's performance (Best Actor / Actress). Especially lauded was the supporting role of actor Haley Joel Osment, whose nominations include an Academy Award, a Broadcast Film Critics Association Award, and a Golden Globe Award. Overall, The Sixth Sense'' was nominated for six Academy Awards and four British Academy Film Awards, but won none. The film received three nominations from the People's Choice Awards and won all of them, with lead actor Bruce Willis being honored for his role. The Satellite Awards nominated the film in four categories, with awards given for writing (M. Night Shyamalan) and editing (Andrew Mondshein). Supporting actress Toni Collette was nominated for both an Academy Award and a Satellite award for her role in the film. James Newton Howard was honored by the American Society of Composers, Authors and Publishers for his composition of the music for the film.

Awards and nominations

References
General

Specific

External links
 

M. Night Shyamalan
Lists of accolades by film
1999-related lists